Louis George "Lou" Blaney (January 4, 1940 – January 25, 2009) was an American racecar driver who raced modifieds and sprint cars. He was also the operator and part-owner of Sharon Speedway.

Early life
Blaney was born in Hartford Township, Trumbull County, Ohio, where his father worked at a sawmill.

Racing career
He won 600 races in 47 years of racing, and is a member of the Northeast Dirt Modified Hall of Fame and Pittsburgh Circle Track Club Halls of Fame.

Personal
He had 3 sons, all of whom raced, as does a grandson.  Dave Blaney is a World of Outlaws champion and former Monster Energy NASCAR Cup Series driver along with his son Ryan, who himself is a Team Penske driver, while Dale Blaney is a sprint car driver.  Dale also was a college basketball player and was drafted by the Los Angeles Lakers, but decided not to pursue an NBA career so that he could focus on racing. In 2001 Blaney was diagnosed with Alzheimer's disease.

Death
On January 25, 2009 Blaney died at age 69. He suffered from undisclosed medical problems for some time, and the cause of death was not released by his family.

A story from a Pittsburgh Newspaper regarding Mr Blaney.

https://www.post-gazette.com/news/obituaries/2009/02/01/Obituary-Lou-Blaney-Sprint-and-modified-race-car-hall-of-famer/stories/200902010219

Legacy
Lou Blaney Memorial Race runs at Sharon Speedway every year.

Awards and accomplishments
National Sprint Car Hall of Fame, 2013 inductee
Eastern Motorsport Press Association Hall of Fame, 2010 inductee

References

1940 births
2009 deaths
Racing drivers from Ohio
People from Trumbull County, Ohio